The Muslim Weekly is a Muslim newspaper published in London. It was the first weekly newspaper for Muslims in the United Kingdom.

Description
The Muslim Weekly was launched in 2003. Published by SNS Media Ltd, it was created by Ahmed Abdul Malik and Mohammed Shahed Alam. Based in London, it is published every Friday and provides UK Muslims with domestic and international news, religious, social and sports reports, alongside commentary, editorials and a letters page for readers.

The Muslim Weekly has an average circulation of 40,000.

References

External links 
 Official Homepage

Islamic newspapers published in the United Kingdom
Weekly newspapers published in the United Kingdom
Islam-related websites
Islamic media
Publications established in 2003
2003 establishments in England
Newspapers published in London